Desudaba (Desudava?) was a Thracian town in the tribal district of Maedica, in ancient Macedonia. It was located 75 M.P. from Almana, on the Axius, where the mercenaries of the Gauls who had been summoned by Perseus of Macedon in the campaign of 168 BCE, took up their position. Writing the 19th century, William Martin Leake placed it at or near Kumanovo, on one of the confluents of the Upper Axius.

See also 
 Dacian davae
 List of ancient cities in Thrace and Dacia
 Dacia
 Roman Dacia

References

External links

Thracian towns
Former populated places in the Balkans
Populated places in ancient Macedonia